4 Real is fourth studio album by Japanese recording artist Crystal Kay. It was released via Epic Records Japan on November 27, 2003, and was made available as a stand-alone CD and for digital consumption. The title 4 Real is play on the phrase "for real"—signifying the singer's fourth record. It contains primarily contemporary R&B influences and saw contributions from various songwriters and producers, including M-Flo, Yoshika and Keri Hilson, among others. The album spawned four singles, which were all released over the course of 2003.

Commercially, 4 Real peaked at number six on the Oricon Albums Chart and became her second top-ten album in Japan, following the top-three release Almost Seventeen (2002). The album continued to chart for a total of 25 weeks in the country. Within a month of the album's release, it was certified gold by the Recording Industry Association of Japan (RIAJ) for physical shipments of over 250,000 units. It went on to sell over 246,000 copies in 2004, and was ranked the 59th best-selling album of the year in Japan.

Track listing

Charts

Album

Singles

Sales and certifications

Release history

References

External links 
 

2003 albums
Crystal Kay albums
Epic Records albums